The Alltuni were a wealthy and powerful Albanian feudal family at a time when the present day territory of Albania was under Ottoman rule. For almost two centuries they ruled over the entire region of Kavajë and large parts of the Myzeqe plains.

They are thought to be the descendants of Kapudan Pasha, a beylerbey and great admiral from Ulqin who was likely the son in law of Sultan Ahmed.
Their great wealth was accumulated through sea trade, especially in the exports of livestock.

The Alltuni made alliances with the Bushatlliu family of Shkodër who later rebelled against the Sublime Porte. 
Members of this powerful family formed blood ties through marriage with other notable Albanian families such as the Taushani family of Elbasan, the Toptani family of Krujë, the Karbunara (Shehu) family of Lushnjë and later the Zogolli family of Mat.

In traditional literature, the Alltuni are mentioned in Gjergj Fishta's epic poem Lahuta e malcis (p. 227 – Te ura e sutjeskës).

Alltuni family tree
The origin of the "Alltuni" family name possibly derives from the Ottoman-Turkish word altın which means golden.

بك Kapllan Beu
Shahsivar Alltuni
أغا Ibrahim Aga Bostanxhiu (Commander of the mukata of Durrës).
Mahmud Alltuni
Married into the Taushani household.Married to Kaje Hanëmi, the daughter of Mehmet Pashë Bushatlliu.
بك Sulejman BeuMarried into the Toptani household but later divorced to marry the widow (Kaje Hanëmi) of his older brother who had just died.
پاشا Omer Pasha (Vali of Iskodra from 1755–1757; Sanjak-bey of Elbasan and Avlona from 1756–1768).
Halil Pasha Alltuni
Mehmet Alltuni
شیخ Ibrahim Karbunara (Cleric, politician and one of the main organizers of the Congress of Lushnjë)
Ruhije Alltuni
Married into the Zogolli household. Was the paternal grandmother of King Zog.
Xhemal Pasha Zogu
Zog I of Albania
Shahsivar Alltuni (Deputy subprefect, mayor and parliament member representing Kavajë. Married to King Zog's paternal aunt.)

References